The sport of association football in Curaçao is run by the Curaçao Football Federation. The association administers the national football team, as well as the Curaçao League.  The main annual football tournament is the Chippie Polar Cup, an annual friendly event held since 2004 which has involved clubs from the Netherlands, Brazil, Suriname, Aruba and Curaçao.

The Chippie Polar Cup
The tournament is organized by Project Support Curaçao NV (PSC) and the matches are held at the Ergilio Hato Stadion (SDK), in Brievengat. The first two editions were held under the name Inter Expo Cup.

Cup winners 

 2004:  Netherlands Antilles national football team
 2005:  Walking Bout Company
 2006:  FC Groningen
 2007:  FC Utrecht
 2008:  FC Groningen
 2009:  Dutch Caribbean Stars
 2010:  Ajax
 2013:  ADO Den Haag

2004 Edition
January 2004
 Netherlands Antilles  2 - 2  FC Dordrecht
 Suriname  0 - 0  SC Cambuur
 Netherlands Antilles  2 - 1  SC Cambuur
 Suriname  4 - 2  FC Dordrecht
 FC Dordrecht  0 - 4  SC Cambuur
 Netherlands Antilles  2 - 0  Suriname

2005 Edition
January 2005
 Walking Bout Company  2 - 1  FC Dordrecht
 Netherlands Antilles  2 - 3  Jong Feyenoord
 Jong Feyenoord  0 - 0  FC Dordrecht
 Netherlands Antilles  0 - 4  Walking Bout Company
 Netherlands Antilles  1 - 2  FC Dordrecht
 Walking Bout Company  0 - 0  Jong Feyenoord

2006 Edition
May 2006:
 FC Groningen  2 - 1  Suriprofs
 Deportivo Barber  3 - 1  Netherlands Antilles U21
Third place match:
 Suriprofs  5 - 2  Netherlands Antilles U21
Final:
 FC Groningen  2 - 1  Deportivo Barber

2007 Edition
June 2007:
 FC Utrecht  2 - 1  FC Dordrecht
 Deportivo Barber  0 - 2  Ferroviário AC
Third place match:
 Deportivo Barber  1 - 1  FC Dordrecht (Deportivo Barber wins 4 - 3 on penalties)
Final:
 FC Utrecht  1 - 0  Ferroviário AC

2008 Edition
May 2008:
 Netherlands Antilles  2 - 1  Suriname
 FC Groningen  3 - 0  EC Flamengo
Third place match:
 EC Flamengo  2 - 0  Suriname
Final:
 Netherlands Antilles  2 - 4  FC Groningen

2009 Edition
May 2009:
 RKSV Centro Dominguito  5 - 0  SV Britannia
 Dutch Caribbean Stars  4 - 0  FCS Nacional
Third place match:
 FCS Nacional  4 - 2  SV Britannia
Final:
 Dutch Caribbean Stars  1 - 1  RKSV Centro Dominguito (DCS wins on penalties)

2010 Edition
21–23 May.
Dutch Caribbean Stars  1 - 4  N.E.C.
Ajax  3 - 0  Hubentut Fortuna
Third place match:
Hubentut Fortuna  2 - 0  Dutch Caribbean Stars
Final:
N.E.C.  0 - 0  Ajax (Ajax wins 3 - 4 on penalties)

2013 Edition
29 May – 21 June.
The tournament was not held in 2011 and 2012, but returned under a new sponsor in 2013 and known as the Multipost Polar Cup.

ADO Den Haag  2 - 0  FC Dordrecht
Inter Moengotapoe  1 - 2  RKSV Centro Dominguito
Third place match:
FC Dordrecht  2 - 1  Inter Moengotapoe
Final:
ADO Den Haag  2 - 2  RKSV Centro Dominguito (ADO Den Haag wins 4 - 3 on penalties)

Dutch Caribbean Stars
Dutch Caribbean Stars is an organization that participates in charity matches with players from the Netherlands, the Netherlands Antilles and Aruba.

History
The foundation was founded in 2009 and the team is headed by former N.E.C. player and assistant coach of the Curaçao national football team, Remko Bicentini. The proceeds will benefit (youth) sports projects in the Netherlands Antilles and Aruba. The Dutch Caribbean Stars are intended as a counterpart to the Suri Profs from Suriname. DCS won the 2009 Chippie Polar Cup defeating RKSV Centro Dominguito in penalty kicks.

On 9 May 2010 the Dutch Caribbean Stars travelled to Dordrecht, Netherlands to play in a charity match against FC Dordrecht.

League system

Stadiums in Curaçao

External links
Official website of the Chippie Polar tournament

See also
Soccer in Saba

References